Estonian Table Tennis Association (abbreviation ETTA) is one of the sport governing bodies in Estonia which deals with table tennis.

ETTA is established on 24 November 1990 in Tallinn. ETTA is a member of International Table Tennis Federation (ITTF).

References

External links
 

Sports governing bodies in Estonia
National members of the European Table Tennis Union
Sports organizations established in 1990
Table tennis in Estonia